Stephen Kjell Foyn (born June 23, 1959) is a Norwegian ice hockey player. He played for the Norwegian national ice hockey team, and participated at the Winter Olympics in 1980, 1984, and 1988.

Foyn was Norwegian champion with the club Sparta in 1984 and 1989. He was awarded Gullpucken as best Norwegian ice hockey player in 1990.

References

External links

1959 births
Living people
Färjestad BK players
Ice hockey players at the 1980 Winter Olympics
Ice hockey players at the 1984 Winter Olympics
Ice hockey players at the 1988 Winter Olympics
Norwegian ice hockey left wingers
Olympic ice hockey players of Norway
Sportspeople from Karlstad
Sparta Warriors players
Timrå IK players